The 1958 Australia rugby union tour of New Zealand was a series of rugby union matches played by "Wallabies" in 1958.

The test series was lost with a victory for Australia and two for New Zealand

Matches 
Scores and results list Wallaibies' points tally first.

Bibliography 
 

Australia national rugby union team tours of New Zealand
Tour
New Zealand Rugby Union